Vme Kids is a Spanish-language children's television channel operated by V-me Media, catering to the needs of preschool-aged Hispanic and Latino Americans. The channel launched exclusively through AT&T U-verse cable systems on September 1, 2010, and has expanded its carriage since then.

History

Seeing a lack of preschool entertainment options for Hispanic children in the United States, V-me Media decided to launch the first 24-hour Spanish-language children's channel in the nation. Utilizing content and experienced gained through its daily kids block on V-me, the channel launched on AT&T U-verse on September 1, 2010.

Programming
 

16 Hudson
1,001 Nights
Babar and the Adventures of Badou
The Bravest Knight
Barney & Friends
Chirp
The Doozers
Doki
Everything's Rosie
The Fixies
Jay's Jungle
Little Malabar
Louie
Lupin's Tales
Matt Hatter Chronicles
Molang
Mouk
No-No
Nouky and Friends
Ping y sus amigos
Pirata and Capitano
Pororo the Little Penguin
Rainbow Chicks
Rob the Robot
Robocar Poli
Robot Trains
Shutterbugs
Tayo the Little Bus
Toby's Travelling Circus
Trotro
Turbozaurs
Yeti Tales
Zou

References

External links
Official website

Children's television networks in the United States
Television networks in the United States
Spanish-language television stations in the United States
Television channels and stations established in 2010
2010 establishments in the United States
Preschool education television networks